No problem is an English expression, used as a response to thanks (among other functions). It is regarded by some as a less formal alternative to you're welcome, which shares the same function.

Informality
Some people find the expression, particularly when employed in the service industry, to be rude, implying that a reasonable request could have been received as problematic or unwelcome. However, in the culture of younger Americans, no problem is often used as a more conversational alternative to you're welcome.

It is widely believed that younger speakers especially favor no problem over you're welcome, and empirical research has corroborated this belief.

No problemo
"No problemo" is "a popular elaboration" of "no problem" also used and popularized in North American English.

The expression is sometimes used as an instance of "pseudo-Spanish" or Mock Spanish. An early example appears in a 1959 edition of the American Import and Export Bulletin, with an advertisement stating: "Foreign shipping is No Problemo". Many Spanish words from Latin roots that have English cognates have an -o in Spanish from the masculine Latin suffix -us, such as "insect", "pilot", and "leopard"; however, "problem" belongs to the group of words ending with an a in Spanish that have a similar English counterpart, such as "poet", "ceramic" and "rat".

In the constructed languages of Esperanto and Ido, the word "problem" translates as "problemo". However, the etymology of the expression's use in the English language cannot be traced to either of these languages.

See also
No worries
Hakuna matata

Footnotes

References

External links

IMDb quotes

English phrases
American slang